Miguel Ángel de las Cuevas Barberá (born 19 June 1986) is a Spanish professional footballer who plays for Córdoba CF. A versatile midfield element, he can play both in the wings and behind the forwards, but usually occupies the attacking midfielder position.

After starting out at Hércules, he went on to appear in 201 La Liga matches over eight seasons, totalling 18 goals for Atlético Madrid, Sporting de Gijón and Osasuna. He added 127 games in Segunda División (16 goals), and also spent one year in the Italian Serie B with Spezia.

Club career
Born in Alicante, Valencian Community, de las Cuevas started his professional career with hometown club Hércules CF, in the Segunda División B. In the 2004–05 season, he was instrumental as the team achieved promotion to the Segunda División after a six-year-absence.

For the 2006–07 campaign, de las Cuevas signed a five-year contract with Atlético Madrid. During preseason, on 13 August, in the Teresa Herrera Trophy match against Club Nacional de Football, he suffered a serious ankle injury that kept him out of action for more than one year.

De las Cuevas finally made his debut for the Colchoneros on 12 December 2007, playing the second half of a Copa del Rey away tie against Granada 74 CF, in the round of 32. He appeared in 13 La Liga matches in his first season after returning from injury, 12 as a substitute.

On 25 June 2009, after producing slightly the same numbers with Atlético, de las Cuevas moved to fellow top-tier side Sporting de Gijón on a four-year deal. However, Atlético retained an option to rebuy in the first three. He had a breakthrough season in 2009–10, ranking second in goals in the team at eight; highlights included braces against RCD Mallorca (4–1), Athletic Bilbao (2–1, away) and one against former club Atlético (1–1) that certified Sporting's permanence in the top flight for a further year, on 8 May 2010.

Still under manager Manuel Preciado, de las Cuevas was again an undisputed starter for Gijón in the 2010–11 campaign. On 2 April 2011, he scored the only goal in a win over Real Madrid at the Santiago Bernabéu Stadium, ending José Mourinho's record of nine years and 150 league matches unbeaten at home; he only missed one league game and netted six times, in another final escape from relegation.

De las Cuevas was loaned to CA Osasuna on 11 January 2013, thus returning to the top flight. The move was made permanent in late May after the Navarrese managed to retain their status, with a €1.2 million fee being paid in equal shares to Atlético and Sporting.

On 29 January 2015, de las Cuevas terminated his contract that ran until June 2016, and moved abroad for the first time in his career at the age of 28, signing with Spezia Calcio in Italy. His first appearance in the Serie B occurred on 14 February, as he featured 73 minutes in a 0–0 draw at Carpi F.C. 1909.

In late September 2015, de las Cuevas successfully underwent surgery to his heart after an anomaly was detected. He was sidelined for six months.

De las Cuevas returned to Osasuna on 1 February 2016, on a free transfer. He left the club in July 2018 after his contract expired, and signed a one-year deal with Córdoba CF on 31 August.

De las Cuevas scored a career-best nine goals in 2018–19, but his team suffered relegation from the second tier. He continued to be first choice the following years.

References

External links

1986 births
Living people
Spanish footballers
Footballers from Alicante
Association football midfielders
La Liga players
Segunda División players
Segunda División B players
Primera Federación players
Segunda Federación players
Hércules CF B players
Hércules CF players
Atlético Madrid footballers
Sporting de Gijón players
CA Osasuna players
Córdoba CF players
Serie B players
Spezia Calcio players
Spain youth international footballers
Spanish expatriate footballers
Expatriate footballers in Italy
Spanish expatriate sportspeople in Italy